Lamandau Regency is one of the thirteen regencies which comprise the Central Kalimantan Province on the island of Kalimantan (Borneo),  Indonesia. The town of Nanga Bulik is the capital of Lamandau Regency. The population of Lamandau Regency was 63,199 at the 2010 census, and 97,611 at the 2020 census; the official estimate as at mid 2021 was 100,535.

Administrative Districts 
Lamandau Regency consists of eight districts (kecamatan), tabulated below with their areas and population totals from the 2010 census and the 2020 census, together with the official estimates as at mid 2021. The table also includes the locations of the district administrative centres, the number of administrative villages (rural desa and urban kelurahan) in each district, and its postal codes.

Note: (a) except the town of Nanga Bulik (with a post code of 74611) and the village of Kujan (with a post code of 74612).

Climate
Nanga Bulik has a tropical rainforest climate (Af) with heavy rainfall year-round.

References

Regencies of Central Kalimantan